WOTW may refer to:

 WFYY, a radio station licensed to serve Windermere, Florida, United States, which held the call sign WOTW from 2014 to 2022
 WGEN-FM, a radio station licensed to serve Monee, Illinois, United States, which held the call sign WOTW from 2007 to 2013
 Mirsky's Worst of the Web
 The War of the Worlds (disambiguation)
 Weight of the World (disambiguation)
 Will-o'-the-wisp (disambiguation)
 Window on the World (disambiguation)
 Wonders of the World (disambiguation)
 "WOTW / POTP", a song by Coldplay from their 2019 album Everyday Life
 "Writing on the Walls", a song by Underoath